Castanopsis sieboldii, also known as the Itajii chinkapin or Itajii, is a species of evergreen tree that lives in subtropical eastern Asia.
This is a climax species that is commonly found in the Japanese temperate rainforest. Specimens are also present within the forest area of the Tokyo Imperial Palace.

Castanopsis sieboldii was once thought to be a subspecies of the similar Castanopsis cuspidata.

Plants and animals associated with this tree include:
Aspidistra elatior, the cast-iron plant, grows in the understorey.
Acrocercops mantica, Chrysocercops castanopsidis, and Lymantria albescens larvae of these Asian moths likely mine the leaves.
Amantis nawai, a small praying mantis species native to Eastern Asia is known to live around C. sieboldii where it eats insects.
Okinawa rail, a Japanese bird, lives among these trees.

Gallery

References

External links

sieboldii